{{DISPLAYTITLE:Xi2 Lupi}}

Xi2 Lupi (ξ2 Lup, ξ2 Lupi) is a member of a double star with Xi1 Lupi in the southern constellation of Lupus. As of 2004, the pair had an angular separation of 10.254 arcseconds along a position angle of 49.21°. Xi2 Lupi is visible to the naked eye with an apparent visual magnitude of 5.55. Based upon an annual parallax shift of 21.71 mas as seen from Earth, it is located roughly 150 light-years from the Sun. It has a peculiar velocity of  relative to its neighbors, and is probably (86% chance) a runaway star.

Xi2 Lupi is about 381 million years old and is spinning relatively rapidly with a projected rotational velocity of 184 km/s.

References

B-type main-sequence stars
Runaway stars
Lupus (constellation)
Lupi, Xi2
Durchmusterung objects
142630
078106
5926